Osbe (Greek: Όσβη) was an ancient town in North Chalcidice, probably between Mygdonia, Mounts Cholomon, Cissus and Bottike. It was later incorporated in Thessalonica, (315 BC). Its only known citizen is  Andreas, Andronos Osbaios c. 400-350 BC who died in Beroea (tomb stele).

References

Geography of ancient Mygdonia
Thessaloniki (regional unit)
Cities in ancient Macedonia
Populated places in ancient Macedonia
Former populated places in Greece